Abū'l-Najm Badr ibn ʿAbdallāh al-Jamālī al-Mustanṣirī, better known as Badr al-Jamali was a vizier and prominent statesman for the Fatimid Caliphate under Caliph al-Mustansir. His appointment to the vizierate in 1073 restored the fortunes of the Fatimid state, which had faced collapse in the previous decades, but also began a period where the vizierate was dominated by military strongmen who held power through their military strength, rather than through the Caliph's appointment. An Armenian, Badr al-Jamali initiated a wave of Armenian migration into Egypt, and was the first of a series of viziers of Armenian origin, who played a major role in the fortunes of the Fatimid Caliphate over the subsequent century.

Early life and career in Syria 
Of Armenian ethnic origin, Badr was born sometime between 1005 and 1008; he is recorded as being over 80 years of age at the time of his death. Badr was purchased as a slave (mamlūk) by Jamal al-Dawla ibn Ammar, ruler of Tripoli, whence he acquired his epithet (nisbah) of al-Jamālī. Otherwise his early life and career until  are obscure. However, the historian Seta Dadoyan suggests that he may be identifiable with a namesake Abu'l-Najm Badr, an Armenian ghulām who briefly ruled over Aleppo in 1022.

Badr's career begins to be documented in April 1063, when he was appointed military governor (wālī) of Damascus and its province, bearing the honorific titles of Crown of Commanders (Tāj al-Umarāʾ), Commander of the Armies (Muqaddam al-Juyūsh), and Honour of the Realm (Sharaf al-Mulk). He made Mizza near Damascus his residence. His tenure was cut short little more than a year later after clashes between his troops and the local militia (aḥdāth), under the local Alid notable Abu Tahir Haydara i Abu al-Husayn. In July 1066, he was re-appointed to the post. His seat was at the Qasr al-Saltanah in the Bab al-Hadid plain. His sons also served as officers in the Fatimid army under his command. One of them, Sha'ban, died at Acre at this time. His tenure in Damascus was again troubled. In 1068, Abu Tahir launched another rebellion in 1068, which saw his palace burned to the ground, before the uprising was defeated.

Badr's troubles in Syria were symptomatic of the wider malaise afflicting the Fatimid state, which during this period neared complete collapse. The accession of the caliph al-Mustansir had opened the central government to intrigues and rivalries; the vizierate was held by favourites of the Caliph's mother, and factional infighting between the different ethnic contingents of the Fatimid army broke out, crippling the administration and exhausting the treasury. Open civil war reigned in Cairo between the Turks and the black Nubians (Sūdān) in 1062–1067, before the Turks, under Nasir al-Dawla ibn Hamdan, seized power in the capital and in Lower Egypt. The situation was made worse by a severe famine from 1065 to 1072, and by Nasir al-Dawla's tyrannical regime: his Turks looted the Fatimid palaces and libraries and destroyed much of the capital, and in 1070, Ibn Hamdan even had the Friday prayer read in the name of the Abbasid Caliph, thereby effectively deposing al-Mustansir. The prevailing anarchy left the Fatimid royal family destitute, the treasury empty, and various parts of the Fatimid empire under military occupation: the Turks in Cairo, the Lawata and other Berbers on the coast, the Nubians in Upper Egypt, and Syria under invasion by the Seljuk Turks.

The Fatimids had already lost effective control over northern Syria in the early 1060s. In 1070, Mahmud ibn Mirdas of Aleppo ordered the Friday prayer to be read in the name of the Abbasid Caliph, while on 19 January 1071, the Seljuk ruler Alp Arslan crossed the river Euphrates into Syria, before being hastily diverted north to fight the Byzantines at Manzikert. In addition, the Fatimids began losing control over the coastal cities of the Levant, which were nominally under Fatimid suzerainty: Ibn Abu Aqil of Tyre and Amin al-Dawla Abu Talib al-Hasan ibn Ammar of Tripoli, supported by the cities' merchant aristocracies, ruled as autonomous princes. To counter these threats, in 1069/70 Badr was appointed Commander-in-chief of the Armies (Amīr al-Juyūsh) and sent to Syria at the head of an army composed of Berbers and Armenians. To keep watch over the coastal cities, and to secure his own communications with Egypt over the sea, he established his residence in the coastal city of Acre.

In his absence, Ibn Hamdan, who had temporarily lost power, once again seized control of the capital. To secure his position, Ibn Hamdan tried to ensure that his powerful rival remained occupied in Syria. While Badr was engaged with besieging Tyre, Ibn Hamdan encouraged rebellions among the Bedouin tribes of the Banu Kalb and Banu Tayy, as well as sending encouraging messages to the renegade governor of Damascus, Mu'alla ibn Haydar, and even to Alp Arslan himself, inviting him to invade Syria and conquer it from the Fatimids. Conversely, Badr recruited to his cause the Oghuz clan of the Nawikis, that was fleeing the onslaught of the Seljuks, to combat the Bedouins. The Nawikis soon began quarreling with Badr, demanding greater payments for their service. Some joined the Bedouin, while others, under Atsiz ibn Uvaq, founded an independent principality in Palestine and the interior of southern Syria, which acknowledged the suzerainty of the Abbasid Caliph and the Seljuk Sultan in Baghdad. By 1076, Jerusalem, Ramlah, and other cities had fallen to the Nawikis, leaving only the coastlands in Fatimid hands.

Vizierate

Rise to power 
In 1073, Nasir al-Dawla was murdered by a rival Turkish commander. In the same year, the famine ended following a good harvest. Al-Mustansir seized upon a drastic solution to his problems, and secretly called upon Badr for aid. The latter accepted, provided that he could bring him his Armenian guard with him. At the end of 1073, Badr was in Damietta, and arrived in Cairo in January 1074.

Unaware of the reason for his arrival, the Turkish leaders did not suspect him of ill intentions. As a result, Badr was able to achieve the assassination of all Turkish military leaders in the capital within a short time of his arrival. Following this feat, al-Mustansir proclaimed Badr as vizier with a plenitude of powers and titles: as well as remaining Amīr al-Juyūsh, he was also chief justice as "Protector of the judges of the Muslims" (Kāfil quḍāt al-Muslimīn), and head of the Isma'ili daʿwa as "Guide of the Missionaries of the Believers" (Hādī duʿāt al-Muʿminīn). Although the Fatimid caliph was left in place, Badr established a military-based regime, in which he ruled "as a military yet populist dictator" (Seta B. Dadoyan). Medieval Arabic authors describe his position as a "vizierate with plenary powers" (wizārat al-tafwīḍ), which to all intents and purposes was similar to the position of sultan, established by the Seljuk rulers vis-à-vis the Abbasid caliphs. The military character of Badr's office was exemplified by the title of Amīr al-Juyūsh (popularly mirgush), which not only became the name most commonly associated with him, but was also used by Badr as his proper patronymic. His private army, some 7,000 strong, formed the core of a new force, called the Juyūshiyya, while his own properties and servants were designated Juyush-i.

Domestic governance
Following the establishment of control over Cairo, Badr proceeded to restore central control in the Nile Delta, from east to west, culminating in the storming of Alexandria. The re-establishment of Fatimid control over Upper Egypt proved more difficult, as the local Arab tribes defended the virtual independence they had gained over the previous years. By 1076, Badr had restored the authority of the central government over Egypt, and the Caliph al-Mustansir was reduced to the purely ritual role as head of the Isma'ili community. Although Isma'ilism was restored as the official doctrine, Fatimid ceremonies were reduced, and Sunnis and other Shi'a communities were allowed to practice their faith. Badr retained overall control of religious affairs, and sponsored the building of both mosques and churches.

Badr also undertook a major administrative reform of Egypt. Until that time, the country had been divided in a large number (between 60 and 96) of small districts (kūra), which in some form or other dated to the pagarchiae of Greco-Roman Egypt. Badr abolished and replaced them with 23 provinces (14 in Lower Egypt and 9 in Upper Egypt), which in broad outlines survive to the present day. In addition, Badr encouraged the immigration of Armenians, Muslim and Christian alike, into Egypt. Badr also sponsored the Armenian Church, which became a serious rival to the Coptic Church and established its own, separate hierarchy. By the end of the century, the Armenian community in Egypt numbered almost 100,000 people, and was represented among the highest civil and military offices of Fatimid Egypt.

Military activities
In 1075, the two holy cities, Mecca and Medina, who had for a time recognized the Abbasid caliphs, reverted to Fatimid suzerainty. In the same year, dissensions arose between Atsiz and his brothers. One of them, Mankli, made contact with Badr, and even restored the name of al-Mustansir in the Friday prayer in his territories around Acre. He did not last long against Atsiz, however, and was forced to flee to Rufaynah in the north. In October 1076, Atsiz marched against Egypt but Badr declared jihād against him. Defeated, Atsiz withdrew to Syria. In 1079, Badr sent his fellow Armenian, Nasr al-Dawla, against Atsiz in Damascus, while from the north the Seljuks under Tutush approached the city (October 1079). In the event, the Fatimids withdrew, and Damascus, along with most of Syria, fell to the Seljuks.

Death and legacy
Badr died on 21 June 1094. Al-Mustansir tried to regain the powers he had ceded to him, but the majority of Badr's officers supported the succession of Badr's son al-Afdal as vizier.

Badr's position in the history of the Fatimid state is pivotal. While the fusion of administrative and judicial powers in the person of the vizier was the culmination of a process already evident under previous holders, Badr was the first military man to rise to the vizierate ("vizier of the sword") under the Fatimids, and furthermore owed his position not to the Caliph, but to the support of a private military force, personally loyal to him. In this Badr also set the tone for his successors: until the end of the Fatimid regime in 1171, the vizierate was held mostly by military strongmen, who sidelined the caliphs and were the de facto rulers of the state. Many of these strongmen were Armenian, like Badr: Badr with his son al-Afdal and grandson Kutayfat provided a "miniature dynasty" of viziers, and three more Muslim Armenian viziers would follow until the assassination of the last of them, Ruzzik ibn Tala'i, in 1163. During this "Armenian period" in the history of Fatimid Egypt, the Armenians provided the mainstay of the Fatimid dynasty.

Buildings 
In the 1080s, to protect the city from possible Seljuk attack, Badr ordered the refortification of Cairo. The old mud brick walls, built when Cairo had been founded in the 970s, were entirely replaced by a new stone fortification, supervised by builders from northern Syria. Three of the gates of Badr's city wall still stand to this day (Bab al-Futuh, Bab al-Nasr, and Bab Zuweila), as well as a section of the northern city wall. He also built the Juyushi Mosque on the Muqattam Hill, in memory of his son Awhad, who rebelled in Alexandria and was killed in 1085. Among the most notable surviving wood art objects from the Fatimid period is also the minbar commissioned by Badr for the shrine of the head of Husayn ibn Ali in Ascalon (now located at the Ibrahimi Mosque in Hebron; see Minbar of the Ibrahimi Mosque).

References

Sources

 , pp. 96–109

Further reading
 

1000s births
1094 deaths
Year of birth uncertain
11th-century Armenian people
11th-century people from the Fatimid Caliphate
Ethnic Armenian Shia Muslims
Generals of the Fatimid Caliphate
Fatimid governors of Damascus
Viziers of the Fatimid Caliphate
Fatimid ghilman
Converts to Shia Islam from Christianity
Medieval Armenian generals